Sugar Creek is an  tributary of the Driftwood River in east-central Indiana in the United States.  Via the Driftwood, White, Wabash and Ohio rivers, it is part of the watershed of the Mississippi River.

Sugar Creek was likely so named from the sugar trees growing along its banks.

Course
Sugar Creek rises in western Henry County and flows generally southwestwardly through Madison, Hancock, Shelby and Johnson counties, past the towns of Spring Lake and New Palestine.

Sugar Creek has a mean annual discharge of 532 cubic feet per second near Edinburgh, Indiana.

See also
List of Indiana rivers

References

Columbia Gazetteer of North America entry
DeLorme (1998).  Indiana Atlas & Gazetteer.  Yarmouth, Maine: DeLorme.  .

Rivers of Indiana
Rivers of Hancock County, Indiana
Rivers of Henry County, Indiana
Rivers of Johnson County, Indiana
Rivers of Madison County, Indiana
Rivers of Shelby County, Indiana
Tributaries of the Wabash River